The Progressive Caucus of the New York City Council is a bloc of progressive New York City Councilmembers that was formed in 2009.  In 2010, the Caucus consisted of 12 members, nearly 25% of the 51-member New York City Council. The caucus grew to 35 members following the 2021 city council elections, before narrowing to 20 members in February 2023 following new bylaws requiring members to sign on to their Statement of Principles. It is co-chaired by Shahana Hanif (D-Brooklyn) and Lincoln Restler (D-Brooklyn). Jennifer Gutierrez (D-Brooklyn) and Carmen De La Rosa (D-Manhattan) are Vice Co-Chairs.

Statement of principles 
The Progressive Caucus's stated objective is to create a "more just and equal New York City, combating all forms of discrimination, and advancing policies that offer genuine opportunities to all New Yorkers, especially those who have been left out of our society's prosperity." The Caucus's stated principles prioritize (i) a "fair budget", (ii) a progressive economic policy, (iii) "safe, decent, affordable housing", (iv) "high-quality public education", (v) "a more sustainable and environmentally just city", (vi) "strong, vibrant, diverse neighborhoods", (vii) a criminal justice system focused on "prevention, alternatives-to-incarceration,  partnership with communities, and police accountability", (viii) "full civil rights for all New Yorkers", and (ix) a restoration of "confidence and participation of government" and "strengthening the practice of local democracy".

Legislative agenda 
The Progressive Caucus website shares 7 issue areas with related bills that they are prioritizing. They are:

 Banning Solitary Confinement
 Prohibiting housing discrimination on the basis of arrest record or criminal history
 The "Public Bank Package"
 Police Transparency
 The "Zero Waste Package"
 Creating Permanently Affordable Housing
 The Earned Safe and Sick Time Act Expansion for Gig Workers

History 
The Progressive Caucus was formed in 2009 order to promote policies focused on building "a more just and equal New York City." The Caucus initially consisted of 12 members, co-chaired by Brad Lander (D-Brooklyn) and Melissa Mark-Viverito (D-Manhattan/Bronx). 

In July 2016, the caucus encouraged New York Governor Andrew Cuomo to sign an anti-Airbnb bill into law. This bill, the first of its kind as it pertained to regulation of Airbnb, was signed into law in the state of New York on October 21, 2016. Also, in November 2016, the caucus endorsed Minnesota Congressman Keith Ellison for chairman of the Democratic National Committee.

Members
Current membership includes the following members:

 Christopher Marte (D-Manhattan)
 Carlina Rivera (D-Manhattan)
 Carmen De la Rosa (D-Manhattan)
 Pierina Sanchez (D-The Bronx)
 Althea Stevens (D-The Bronx)
 Amanda Farias (D-The Bronx)
 Tiffany Caban (D-Queens)
 Shekar Krishnan (D-Queens)
 Julie Won (D-Queens)
 Nantasha Williams (D-Queens)
 City Council Speaker Adrienne Adams (D-Queens, ex-officio member)
 Lincoln Restler (D-Brooklyn)
 Jennifer Gutierrez (D-Brooklyn)
 Crystal Hudson (D-Brooklyn)
 Chi Osse (D-Brooklyn)
 Sandy Nurse (D-Brooklyn)
 Alexa Aviles (D-Brooklyn)
 Shahana Hanif (D-Brooklyn)
 Rita Joseph (D-Brooklyn)
 Charles Barron (D-Brooklyn)

Membership during the 2018-2021 term included the following members:
 Co-chair Ben Kallos (D-Manhattan) 
 Co-chair Diana Ayala (D-Manhattan/The Bronx)
 Vice Co-Chair Keith Powers (D-Manhattan)
 Vice Co-Chair Carlos Menchaca (D-Brooklyn)
 City Council Speaker Corey Johnson (D-Manhattan)
 Margaret Chin (D-Manhattan)
 Carlina Rivera (D-Manhattan)
 Brad Lander (D-Brooklyn)
 Steve Levin (D-Brooklyn)
 Mark Levine (D-Manhattan)
 Carlos Menchaca (D-Brooklyn)
 I. Daneek Miller (D-Queens)
 Ydanis Rodriguez (D-Manhattan)
 Deborah Rose (D-Staten Island)
 Ritchie Torres (D-Bronx)
 Jimmy Van Bramer (D-Queens)
 Jumaane Williams (D-Brooklyn)

References

External links
 Official website
 Statement of Principles
 Official Facebook page

New York City Council
Issue-based groups of legislators